Matvei Ivanovich Vasilenko (– 1 July 1937) was a Soviet komkor (corps commander).

He fought in the Imperial Russian Army during World War I before going over to the Bolsheviks in the subsequent Civil War. He also fought in the war against Poland. 
He commanded the 11th Army (19 December 1919 — 29 March 1920),  the 9th Army (April 5 - July 19, 1920), again the 11th Army (26 July — 12 September 1920) and the 14th Army (27 September–15 November 1920).
He was a recipient of the Order of the Red Banner and the Order of the Red Star.

During the Great Purge, he was arrested on 11 March 1937. On 26 June 1937, Vasilenko's name appeared on an execution list signed by Joseph Stalin, Lazar Kaganovich, Kliment Voroshilov, Andrei Zhdanov and Anastas Mikoyan. He was later executed. In 1956, he was rehabilitated.

Bibliography
 Кадишев А. Б. Интервенция и гражданская война в Закавказье. — М., 1960.
 Лаппо Д. Д. В красно-белом отсвете трагедии. Воронежская губерния (1917—1920 гг.) — Воронеж: Центрально-Черноземное книжное издательство, 1993. — с. 205–207.
 
 Сухоруков В. Т. XI армия в боях на Северном Кавказе и Нижней Волге 1918—1920 гг. — М., 1961.
 
 Страница военно-патриотического клуба «Память» Воронежского госуниверситета

1888 births
1937 deaths
Vasilenko
Russian military personnel of World War I
Soviet military personnel of the Russian Civil War
Recipients of the Order of the Red Banner
Great Purge victims from Russia
People executed by the Soviet Union
Soviet rehabilitations